Guraleus fallaciosa is a species of sea snail, a marine gastropod mollusk in the family Mangeliidae.

Description
The length of the shell attains 10 mm, its diameter 3.25 mm.

(Original description) The dirty white, elongately turreted shell has an acuminate spire with a papillary apex . It contains 6½ convex whorls, barely angulate and densely spirally striated. The sutures are narrowly canaliculate. The aperture is fairly wide. The outer lip is thin and backwards slightly sinuate. The columella is rather straight. .It is a shell of simple character, with a rather long spire and short mouth. It is closely spirally striated, only the upper whorls showing ribs or plicae.

Distribution
This marine species is endemic to Australia and can be found off South Australia, Tasmania, Victoria.

References

 Verco, J.C. 1909. Notes on South Australian marine Mollusca with descriptions of new species. Part XII. Transactions of the Royal Society of South Australia 33: 293–342

External links
  Tucker, J.K. 2004 Catalog of recent and fossil turrids (Mollusca: Gastropoda). Zootaxa 682:1–1295.
  Hedley, C. 1922. A revision of the Australian Turridae. Records of the Australian Museum 13(6): 213–359, pls 42–56

fallaciosa
Gastropods described in 1896
Gastropods of Australia